Tyrone (Ty) Barnett (born 1975) is an American actor and stand-up comic.

Career
Barnett made his first television appearance in 2003 on CBS's Star Search   He cites Chris Rock and Richard Pryor as major influences.

Ty Barnett was born, raised and attended high school on the south side of Chicago. After high school, he  served in the United States Army for six years and was discharged in 1996. He was voted "Up-and-coming Comedian of the Year" in 2002 at the Las Vegas Comedy Festival and named "Outstanding Performer" at Montreal's Just for Laughs Festival. In 2003, he made it to the semi-finals of CBS's Star Search and by 2005 first appeared on CBS's The Late Late Show.

He was featured on Comedy Central Presents and was the 2006  runner-up on the NBC reality show Last Comic Standing. He has appeared on The Tonight Show with Jay Leno, P. Diddy Presents the Bad Boys of Comedy, and in two episodes of 'Til Death. Barnett has also appeared in the feature film Stand Up, as the opening act for Donna Summer, in Premium Blend.  He also auditioned for America's Got Talent in 2020 where he was eliminated in the Judge Cuts.

References

External links
Official website
Last Comic Standing profile

1975 births
Living people
Male actors from Chicago
American male television actors
Male actors from Illinois
Last Comic Standing contestants
African-American male actors
Comedians from Illinois
21st-century American comedians
21st-century African-American people
20th-century African-American people